Blowers Green railway station was a station on the Oxford-Worcester-Wolverhampton Line in Dudley, West Midlands, England.

History
It was opened in 1878 by the Great Western Railway intending to serve the growing communities of Woodside and Netherton. Soon after opening, it was renamed Dudley Southside & Netherton. It was opened immediately north of Netherton station which it replaced.

Three railways/routes served the station - originally the Oxford, Worcester and Wolverhampton Railway and the South Staffordshire Railway, which later became the Great Western Railway and London, Midland and Scottish Railway (through amalgamation of the London and North Western Railway) respectively. There were also services from Dudley to Old Hill along this route as part of GWR's service. The junction to Old Hill diverged between here and Harts Hill.

The line had reasonable passenger usage until about the early 1880s, when it began to slump at several stations, leading to the line becoming a largely freight only operation in 1887. It would remain open for goods traffic, which was considerable at this time, as the district had become highly industrialised in the then heyday of the Black Country's industrial past.

This station was known as Dudley Southside and Netherton until 1921, when it was renamed Blowers Green.

The growing popularity of motor vehicles during the 20th century meant that the station's usage was in decline by the 1950s, and its future was under threat.

British Railways closed the station to passengers in 1962, even though trains from Dudley to Old Hill passed through the station until 1964. It remained as an emergency escape point and access point for railway engineers until late 1965.

Today's usage
Despite being disused for more than 50 years, the station building survives, but was bricked up around the year 2000. The forecourt has been fenced off since 2004 due to youths' anti-social behaviour, structural decay and periodical use by homeless people. Bill-posters are stuck to it from time to time.

Midland Metro
The site of the station is earmarked as the location of a Midland Metro stop which will be opened on the completion of the local tram network's second line.
A £1,100,000/15-year-long regeneration project will see the station become part of the local tram network with the line reopening between Walsall, Dudley Port railway station, Dudley railway station and the Merry Hill Shopping Centre for trams on one track and for freight on the other. The freighters would continue on to Brettell Lane railway station and on to the main line at Stourbridge junction. The closed section of railway through Dudley was expected to re-open by 2013, as a combined Midland Metro tramway and a heavy rail line for goods trains. However lack of funding have set this date back as stated below.

The railway below was last used in 1993, although it is set to re-open in 2023 as part of the long-awaited Wednesbury to Brierley Hill section of the Midland Metro, while the full length of the line between Walsall and Brierley Hill (which closed in 1993) is set to re-open for goods trains.

Historic imagery of the site

References

chasewaterstuff.wordpress.com
streetvi.com
bescot.plus.com

Further reading

Disused railway stations in Dudley
Former Great Western Railway stations
Railway stations in Great Britain opened in 1878
Railway stations in Great Britain closed in 1962